Gerry Fell may refer to:

 Gerry Fell (footballer, born 1898) (1898–1977), English footballer
 Gerry Fell (footballer, born 1951) (born 1951), English footballer